Phostria microselene is a moth in the family Crambidae. It was described by George Hampson in 1918. It is found in Colombia.

References

Phostria
Moths described in 1918
Moths of South America